Milagro de amor ("Miracle of Love") may refer to: 

Milagro de amor (es),  1946 Argentine film directed by Francisco Múgica based on the poem Margerita la tornera by José Zorrilla y Moral 
Milagro de amor (1955 film), a filmed version of Alcides Prado's zarzuela, directed by impresario José Gamboa
Milagro de amor, 1998 album by Opus Cuatro
Milagros de amor, Colombian telenovela 2002